Ari Suhonen (born 19 December 1965 in Porvoo) is a Finnish former middle distance runner.

Suhonen was the best Finnish middle distance runner during the late 1980s and the early 1990s and he still holds the national record in the 800 metres, 1.44,10, ran in Zürich on 16 August 1989. He won national championships in the 800 metres nine times in a row, in the years 1985–1993. He also won the 1500 metres event in the same competition five times, in 1986-1989 and 1993. He was the European Indoor Champion of the 1500 metres in 1988. He also won bronze in the 800 metres of the European Indoor Championships in 1987.

Personal bests

External links
 
 Ari Suhonen's race results at the database of Tilastopaja OY 

1965 births
Living people
People from Porvoo
Finnish male middle-distance runners
Athletes (track and field) at the 1988 Summer Olympics
Olympic athletes of Finland
Universiade medalists in athletics (track and field)
Universiade gold medalists for Finland
Medalists at the 1989 Summer Universiade
Sportspeople from Uusimaa